The Chestnut Hill Historic District is a historic area covering all the Chestnut Hill section of Philadelphia, Pennsylvania.

It was added to the National Register of Historic Places as a historic district in 1985.

Contributing properties
The historic district comprises 1,987 contributing properties over 1,920 acres, including:
The Anglecot (designed by Wilson Eyre)
Druim Moir Historic District, includes Romanesque Revival mansion (1883–86), designed by G. W. & W. D. Hewitt
Graver's Lane Station (1883), designed by Frank Furness
John Story Jenks School (1922), designed by Irwin T. Catharine
Thomas Mill Covered Bridge (across the Wissahickon Creek, the only traditional covered bridge in Philadelphia)
Wissahickon Inn (now Chestnut Hill Academy) (1883–84), designed by G. W. & W. D. Hewitt
Inglewood Cottage (1850), designed by Thomas Ustick Walter
The former site of Boxly, the estate of Frederick Winslow Taylor, where Taylor often received the business-management pilgrims who came to meet the "Father of Scientific Management"
Esherick House (1961), designed by Louis Kahn
Vanna Venturi House (1962–64), designed by Robert Venturi

See also
Awbury Historic District
Colonial Germantown Historic District
RittenhouseTown Historic District
Tulpehocken Station Historic District

References

External links
Chestnut Hill Historical Society
National Register of Historic Places Inventory--Nomination Form

Houses on the National Register of Historic Places in Pennsylvania
Georgian architecture in Pennsylvania
Neighborhoods in Philadelphia
National Register of Historic Places in Philadelphia
History of Philadelphia
Historic districts in Philadelphia
Chestnut Hill, Philadelphia
Houses in Philadelphia
Historic districts on the National Register of Historic Places in Pennsylvania